The Mashriq, sometimes spelled Mashreq or Mashrek, is a term used by Arabs to refer to the eastern part of the Arab world, located in Western Asia and eastern North Africa. Poetically the "Place of Sunrise", the name is derived from the verb sharaqa ( "to shine, illuminate, radiate" and "to rise"), from sh-r-q root (ش-ر-ق), referring to the east, where the sun rises.

The region includes the Arab-majority states of Bahrain, Egypt, Iraq, Jordan, Kuwait, Lebanon, Oman, Qatar, Saudi Arabia, Sudan, the State of Palestine, Syria, the United Arab Emirates, and Yemen.

Geography
As the word Mashriq refers to Arab countries located between the Mediterranean Sea and Iran, it is the companion term to Maghreb, the western part of North Africa. Libya may be regarded as straddling the two regions, receiving influences from both the Maghreb and the Mashriq, with its eastern part (Cyrenaica) being linked more to Egypt and the Mashriq, while western parts (Fezzan and Tripolitania) are tied to the Maghreb.

These geographical terms date from the early Islamic expansion. The Mashriq corresponds to the Bilad al-Sham and Mesopotamian regions combined. , the Mashriq is home to 1.7% of the global population.

Cooperation

All of the countries located in the Arab Mashreq area are members of the Arab League (although Syria's membership is currently suspended), the Greater Arab Free Trade Area, and the United Nations. The region cooperates in several projects including the Arab Mashreq International Road Network and the Arab Mashreq International Railway. Several nations are also members of the GCC and others have tried to achieve political unity in the past, such as the United Arab Republic in the 1960s and 1970s, which originally included both Egypt and Syria.

See also
 Arabia Felix
 Arabian Peninsula
 Cradle of civilization
 Fertile Crescent
 Levant
 Maghreb, "Place of Sunset", which contrasts with Mashriq, "Place of Sunrise"
 Mashriqi Arabic
 Mashriqi Jews
 Nile
 Shaam (Greater Syria)

References

 
Levant
Regions of Asia
Geography of the Middle East
Geography of Western Asia
Geography of North Africa
Historical regions
Middle East
North Africa